The Tara Foundation was a charity organization dedicated to the support of low-income and disabled transsexual people.

Origins 
The foundation was started in 2001 with the assistance of a $10,000 grant from the Marin Community Foundation.  As of April 2008, the Foundation appears to be defunct.

Focus 
The main focus of the Tara Foundation was to provide financial assistance to both transsexual male-to-female women and transsexual female-to-male men for sex reassignment surgery.  Specifically, this assistance was aimed at disabled and low-income transsexual individuals.  The Foundation stated that most insurance companies do not cover transsexual related treatments and maintained that the procedures are "medically necessary and life-changing" as opposed to elective or cosmetic.

The foundation also advocated the advancement of civil rights for transgender people, social acceptance, and the elimination of discrimination toward transgender people.

References 

Foundations based in the United States